The Gourdou-Leseurre GL-812 HY was a 3-seat reconnaissance floatplane, built by Gourdou-Leseurre.

Development
The prototype, called L-2, was built in 1926-27. It has a steel tube fuselage, and rectangular wooden wing. The tail was two fins, one above and one below the fuselage. The entire plane was fabric covered, except the  Gnome-Rhône 9A Jupiter engine, which was left uncowled. The prototype was flown to Copenhagen, and demonstrated there to several countries.

Six prototype L-3s were constructed. They had a larger  Jupiter, steel spars instead of wood, and stronger struts, allowing for shipboard catapult launching. After successfully testing the L-3, the French navy ordered 14 production GL-810 HY aircraft. The first production 810 HY flew on 23 September 1930, taking off from the Seine at Les Mureaux. In 1931, 20 GL-811 HYs were ordered, for operation from the seaplane carrier Commandant Teste and from 1933 to 1934 twenty-nine GL-812 HYs and thirteen GL-813 HYs were ordered.

Variants

Gourdou-Leseurre L-2
The initial prototype of the catapult-launched floatplane observation aircraft.
Gourdou-Leseurre L-3
Six prototype development aircraft with revised structure.
Gourdou-Leseurre GL-810 HY
Initial production - 24 produced for Aeronavale.
Gourdou-Leseurre GL-811 HY
Developed version - 20 built from 1931.
Gourdou-Leseurre GL-812 HY
29 built 1933-34.
Gourdou-Leseurre GL-813 HY
13 built.

Operators

French Navy

Units using this aircraft
Escadrille 7S2 (Commandant Teste)
Escadrille 7S3 (spread among various cruisers)
Escadrilles 1S1, 2S1, 2S4, 3S1, 3S2, 3S3, 3S6, 8S2, 8S5.

While most aircraft had been retired by 1939, that August the remaining aircraft were brought together to re-equip the recently re-activated and mobilized Escadrilles 1S2 and 3S3 at Cherbourg and Berre-l'Étang, respectively and perform coastal anti-submarine patrols.

Specifications (812 HY)

See also

References

Bibliography

 

1920s French military reconnaissance aircraft
GL-812
Aircraft first flown in 1930
Single-engine aircraft